Blaniulus orientalis is a species of millipede in the Blaniulidae family that can be found in France and Spain.

References

Julida
Millipedes of Europe
Animals described in 1921